The Richmond Arts and Culture District stretches from the Institute for Contemporary Art on West Broad to the Virginia State Capitol and spans the Monroe Ward and Jackson Ward neighborhoods. The Arts District was designed to be the center of artistic, cultural, civic, and commercial activity. This district has worked to promote economic prosperity in this area of Richmond and create areas for art galleries and artist living spaces. This inclusive district offers a variety of experiences for all visitors and locals. The Arts District features and supports the history of the Jackson Ward neighborhood, the business activity along West Broad Street, the wide range of downtown art galleries, and eclectic dining and shopping experiences. The District is the first of its kind in the city of Richmond but state law allows there to be more than Arts District in each city.    

The Arts District is the home of the monthly First Fridays Art Walk. First Fridays is held the first Friday evening of every month, people are able to wander the Arts District and visit the art galleries and shops that are staying open late. The event features street performances, live music, gallery openings and special deals at stores.

Anchors and Major Attractions 
 Maggie Walker Museum 
 Valentine Museum 
 Black History Museum 
 Gallery 5 
 Candela Books & Gallery 
 Coliseum 
 Convention Center 
 Library of Virginia 
 Center Stage 
 Ghost Print Gallery 
 The National 
 State Capitol and Visitors Center 
 Downtown Collections Public Library & Special 
 The Hippodrome 
 VCU Institute for Contemporary Art
 Art 6 
 The Renaissance Conference Center 
 1708 Gallery 
 Quirk Gallery 
 ada Gallery 
 Visual Art Studio 
 Metro Sound and Music Recording 
 Theater IV 
 Barksdale Downtown 
 UR Downtown Campus 
 John Marshall House Museum 
 Richmond Ballet 
 Museum of the Confederacy 
 Sound of Music Recording Studios 
 Several notable restaurants and cafes 
 Richmond Symphony

See also 

 Neighborhoods of Richmond, Virginia
 Richmond, Virginia

References 

Neighborhoods in Richmond, Virginia
Arts districts